Michel Plancherel (16 January 1885, Bussy, Fribourg4 March 1967, Zurich) was a Swiss mathematician. He was born in Bussy (Fribourg, Switzerland) and obtained his Diplom in mathematics from the University of Fribourg and then his doctoral degree in 1907 with a thesis written under the supervision of Mathias Lerch. Plancherel was a professor in Fribourg (1911), and from 1920 at ETH Zurich.

He worked in the areas of mathematical analysis, mathematical physics and algebra, and is known for the Plancherel theorem in harmonic analysis. He was an Invited Speaker of the ICM in 1924 at Toronto and in 1928 at Bologna.

He was married to Cécile Tercier, had nine children, and presided at the Mission Catholique Française in Zürich.

See also
Plancherel measure
Plancherel theorem
Plancherel theorem for spherical functions

References

External links
 
  Short biography, Department of mathematics, University of Fribourg

1885 births
1967 deaths
20th-century  Swiss  mathematicians
Swiss Roman Catholics
Academic staff of ETH Zurich
University of Fribourg alumni
Academic staff of the University of Fribourg
People from the canton of Fribourg